D. nobilis may refer to:
 Deckenia nobilis, the millionaire's salad, a flowering plant species endemic to the Seychelles
 Diopsittaca nobilis, the red-shouldered macaw, a small parrot species

See also
 Nobilis (disambiguation)